Dr. James Compton House, also known as the Sandy's Oak Ridge Manor Tea House , is a historic home located at Kansas City, Clay County, Missouri. The original section was built about 1829, as a log dwelling.  It was later enlarged and expanded through 1952 during its ownership by the Compton family. Also on the property are the contributing frame blacksmith shop and frame guest house.  It is one of the oldest surviving residential structures in the city.

It was listed on the National Register of Historic Places in 1979.

References

Houses on the National Register of Historic Places in Missouri
Houses completed in 1829
Buildings and structures in Clay County, Missouri
National Register of Historic Places in Clay County, Missouri
Blacksmith shops